Chris Pedersen (born May 22, 1963) is an American musician, actor, and NASCAR racer.

Pedersen was born in San Francisco and grew up in Southern California. He was the lead guitarist and wrote original material with the punk rock band The Dumps in Santa Barbara, CA 1980–81. In 1981 he briefly played guitar for the punk rock band SIN 34. He was the lead singer / guitarist in the band The Patriots when he went into acting.

Pedersen was never formally trained as an actor.  He was approached by director Penelope Spheeris at a park in Burbank where the band T.S.O.L. was playing. According to Pedersen, who was unemployed at the time, "I was thinking 'yeah, right' and didn't pay any attention to her until she said it paid $100 a day, which at the time was a lot of money. So I showed up for the audition on time and tried really hard not to screw it up. That was the start of my acting career."  He played a punk rocker in Suburbia, and also appeared in Platoon, Night of the Comet and Point Break among others.

He began to distance himself from the film industry in the early 1990s, focusing instead on cars and technology. He had a brief racing history competing in weekly NASCAR events at Saugus speedway 1992–1995 and Irwindale Speedway in 2000.  He founded and led a self-funded DARPA Grand Challenge team, the "AI Motorvators", whose V8-powered "IT Came From The Garage" finished in the semi-finals in 2004 and 2005; they were featured in an episode of the Discovery Channel show Monster Garage.

Filmography

References

External links

1963 births
Living people
American male film actors
Male actors from San Francisco
American male guitarists
American punk rock guitarists
NASCAR drivers
20th-century American guitarists
20th-century American male musicians